Ursula Keller (born 21 June 1959) is a Swiss physicist. She has been a physics professor at the ETH Zurich, Switzerland since 2003 with a speciality in ultra-fast laser technology, an inventor and the winner of the 2018 European Inventor Award by the European Patent Office.

Career 
Ursula Keller grew up in a working-class family. After graduating as a physics engineer in 1984 from the Swiss Federal Institute of Technology in Zurich, she continued her studies at Stanford University, where she obtained a master's degree in applied physics in 1987, and then continued with a doctorate in physics obtained  in 1989. The topic of her studies was the development of a new technique for optical measurement of charge and voltage in GaAs type integrated circuits.

From 1989 to 1993, she worked at AT&T Bell's research centre in New Jersey, where she conducted research on photonic switching, ultra-fast laser technology and semiconductor spectroscopy and developed a method for manufacturing ultra-short pulse lasers.

In 1993, she was appointed Professor of Physics at the Swiss Federal Institute of Technology in Zurich, becoming the school's first female Professor of Physics. In October 1997, she became a full professor.

Her research areas are ultra-fast solid-state and semiconductor lasers, the development of reliable and functional instruments to generate extreme ultraviolet (EUV) X-rays and attosecond science. She developed the first method for generating ultra-fast light pulses known as semiconductor saturable-absorber mirrors (SESAMs), which have become a worldwide industry standard for cutting and welding in fields ranging from electronics and automotive industry to communications technology, medical diagnostics and surgery and has made myriad important contributions to the field of laser science since. Dr. Keller’s earlier research into carrier envelope phase stabilization and frequency comb technology was integral to Theodor W. Hänsch and John L. Hall’s development of laser-based spectroscopy that garnered them the 2005 Nobel Prize in Physics.

Ursula Keller has nearly 700 articles published with total citation of 45131 and h-index of 109. Her most popular publication has cited by 1905 people (as on 12th September 2020).

Ursula Keller is the founder and president of ETH Women Professors Forum

Ursula Keller has patented several inventions in the field of ultra-fast lasers for industrial and medical applications.

She is the creator of the Attoclock, one of the most accurate time measurement devices in the world, which can record time intervals up to a few attoseconds, the billionth part of a billionth of a second.

Since 2010, Ursula Keller has been Director of the Swiss National Research Centre for Ultra-fast Molecular Sciences and Technologies.

Since 2014, she has been a member of the Research Council of the Swiss National Science Foundation.

In 2018, Ursula Keller won the European Inventor Award in the "Lifetime Achievement ". In 2019, she was appointed as one of the leading experts that judges proposals for this award.

She won the IEEE Photonics Award in 2018 and the IEEE Edison Medal in 2019.

She won the 2020 Gold Medal from the Society of Photo-Optical Instrumentation Engineers and the 2020 Frederic Ives Medal / Jarus Quinn Prize from the Optical Society.

Controversy 
In March 2019, in the context of the mobbing allegations against Marcella Carollo, Ursula Keller denounced a "lack of leadership, gender discrimination and corruption at ETH Zurich" and claimed that the reason for the proposed dismissal of her colleague was "not primarily the mobbing allegations, but her gender". Female colleagues strongly disagreed with this statement in an open letter to the leadership of ETH. In the same period, Ursula Keller has been formally reprimanded by ETH Zurich, including the mention of a possible dismissal in case of recurrence. Two external investigations disproved the accusations that Ursula Keller made against ETH Zurich. During these investigations, Ursula Keller retracted her allegations of corruption and abuse of office. Otherwise, the Swiss Federal Audit Office recommended more transparency in the distribution of funds

Awards and honors 

 Joseph Fraunhofer Award / Robert M. Burley Prize from The Optical Society, 2008 "For seminal contributions to the development and application of ultrafast lasers and notably pioneering work on semiconductor saturable absorber mode-locking."
Fellow of the Institute of Electrical and Electronics Engineers (IEEE), 2014 for contributions to ultrashort pulse mode locked laser physics and technology
Charles Hard Townes Award from The Optical Society "For seminal contributions in the fields of octave-spanning lasers, frequency comb technology, and high repetition-rate ultrafast semiconductor disc lasers."
 Weizmann Women and Science Award in 2017
 European Inventor Award 2018 for laser technology in the category “Lifetime achievement.” 
 IEEE Photonics Award, 2018
 IEEE Edison Medal, 2019
 SPIE Gold Medal, 2020
 Frederick Ives Medal/Quinn Prize from The Optical Society in recognition of her work in ultra-fast laser technology
Elected to the National Academy of Sciences in 2021

References

External links
 ETHZ|Department of Physics|Institute for Quantum Electronics|Ultrafast Laser Physics

Fellow Members of the IEEE
Living people
Swiss women scientists
Swiss physicists
20th-century Swiss women
21st-century Swiss women
20th-century Swiss scientists
21st-century Swiss scientists
Swiss women physicists
20th-century women scientists
21st-century women scientists
21st-century Swiss educators
Swiss women educators
Women in optics
Academic staff of ETH Zurich
1959 births
21st-century women educators
IEEE Edison Medal recipients
Foreign associates of the National Academy of Sciences